Santa Maria Regina Pacis a Ostia Lido is a 20th-century parochial church and titular church in Ostia, southwest of Rome, dedicated to Mary, Queen of Peace.

History 

In 1916, it was suggested to Vincenzo Vannutelli, Bishop of Ostia, to construct a church to Our Lady, Queen of Peace, in order to pray for an end to the First World War.

The church was built in 1919–28. It has been visited by Pope Paul VI (1968), Pope John Paul II (1980) and Pope Francis (2015).

The church was made a titular church on 5 March 1973 to be held by a cardinal priest.

Titulars
James Darcy Freeman (1973–1991) 
Paul Joseph Phạm Đình Tụng (1994–2009)
Laurent Monsengwo Pasinya (2010–2021) 
William Goh Seng Chye (2022–present)

Building

In basilica form with side chapels and transept. The nave is covered by a round vault divided into sections, sculpted by the lunettes of the side windows.

References

External links

Titular churches
Rome Q. XXXIV Lido di Ostia Levante
Roman Catholic churches completed in 1928
20th-century Roman Catholic church buildings in Italy
Renaissance Revival architecture in Italy
Baroque Revival architecture